Malene Krause (born 18 June 1963 in Frederiksberg) is a Danish curler and curling coach. She is a four time Olympian, competing in the curling exhibition events in 1988 and 1992 and then the full curling events in 2002 and 2006. Her best result at the Olympics was when her team lost the bronze medal match to Canada in 1992 to finish fourth. Furthermore, Krause has competed in 14 world championships and 14 European championships, earning medals 3 times and 5 times, respectively. Her team's best finish was winning the gold medal at the 1994 European Curling Championship.

She is the mother of former world junior champion Mikkel Krause, skip of Denmark's team at the 2022 Winter Olympic Games.

References

External links 

Living people
Danish female curlers
European curling champions
Olympic curlers of Denmark
Sportspeople from Frederiksberg
1963 births
Curlers at the 2002 Winter Olympics
Curlers at the 2006 Winter Olympics
20th-century Danish women
21st-century Danish women